Bab al-Faraj, meaning the Gate of Deliverance or Bab al-Faradis was one of the 9 main gates of the ancient city walls of Aleppo, Syria. It was located at the northern side of the ancient city. The gate was ruined in 1904. Some remains are still found at the north-eastern part of the gate.

History
Bab al-Faraj was built by Az-Zahir Ghazi and later renovated by An-Nasir Yusuf. The Bab al-Faraj Clock Tower is one of the main landmarks of Aleppo. The tower was built in 1898-1899 by the French architect of Aleppo city Charles Chartier.

Gallery

References

Faraj